Yossef (Joseph) Cedar (Hebrew: יוסף סידר; born August 31, 1968) is an Israeli film director and screenwriter.

Biography
Cedar was born to an Orthodox Jewish family in New York City. His father is biochemist Howard Cedar. When Joseph was 6, his family moved to Israel, and he grew up in the Bayit VeGan neighborhood in Jerusalem. He studied in a Yeshiva High School. In the Israeli army he served as a paratrooper. After graduating in philosophy and history of theatre from the Hebrew University of Jerusalem, he studied cinema studies at New York University.

Film career
When he returned to Israel, he started working on the screenplay for his debut film, Time of Favor (2000), for which he moved and lived for two years in the Israeli settlement Dolev. The film won six Ophir Awards, including Best Picture.

His second film was Campfire (2004), which won five Ophir Awards including Best Picture, with two, Best Director and Best Screenplay, going to Cedar. For Beaufort (2007), his third film, he received the Silver Bear award for Best Director in the Berlin International Film Festival. Beaufort received an Academy Award nomination for Best Foreign Language Film, the first such nomination for an Israeli film in 24 years. It received four Ophir Awards and was based on Cedar's own experiences during his army service on Israel's border with Lebanon.

His film Footnote premiered In Competition at the 2011 Cannes Film Festival. The film was nominated for the Academy Award for Best Foreign Language Film.

Cedar is an Orthodox Jew. His films are known to touch delicate issues of Israeli society. Israeli critic Yair Rave wrote, "One of the reasons I like Cedar's films so much is... his ability to merge the Israeli spirit... with the universal cinematic codes."

Awards and recognition
He has won a Silver Bear and an Ophir Award for Best Director, and an Ophir Award for writing a Best Screenplay. He also won the best screenplay award at the 2011 Cannes Film Festival for his film Footnote (2011).

Filmography
Time of Favor (2000)
Campfire (2004)
Beaufort (2007)
Footnote (2011)
Norman: The Moderate Rise and Tragic Fall of a New York Fixer (2016)

Television
Our Boys (2019)-producer and director.

References

External links

 Joseph Cedar is in the Oscar running, Los Angeles Times interview

1968 births
Israeli Orthodox Jews
Israeli film directors
Israeli male screenwriters
People from Jerusalem
American Orthodox Jews
Living people
Silver Bear for Best Director recipients
American emigrants to Israel
Cannes Film Festival Award for Best Screenplay winners